Jaba Kankava (born 18 March 1986) is a Georgian professional footballer who plays as a defensive midfielder for Slovan Bratislava.

He has previously played for Reims, Dinamo Tbilisi, Alania Vladikavkaz, Arsenal Kyiv, and Dnipro.

Club career
In 2004 Jaba Kankava started his football career with Dinamo Tbilisi, where Gia Geguchadze was just appointed as head coach. Geguchadze started to create a new club with youngsters and Kankava became a main member of them. In his first year, Kankava won the Georgian Cup, and played in the UEFA Europa League scoring the winning goal against Slavia Prague and contributing to the qualification for the group stages.

After one season at Dinamo, Kankava moved to Alania Vladikavkaz, where he played 12 matches, before signing a contract with Arsenal Kyiv in 2005. At Arsenal Kyiv, he played 24 matches and scored 4 goals.

In 2007, Kankava agreed to sign a three-year contract with league rival Dnipro. Newly arrived Kankava was among the starting squad from the first games but received a red card against Dynamo Kyiv because of a tough tackle and missed several games and was among the bench players. In eight years at Dnipro, he played 91 matches and scored 4 goals.

In 2015, Kankava joined Ligue 1 club Reims. In July 2017, he agreed to the termination of his contract which ran until 2018.

On 22 November 2018, Kankava signed a new two-year contract with FC Tobol.

On 16 January 2021, Valenciennes announced the signing of Kankava on a contract until June 2021.

International career
On 8 September 2004, Kankava made his debut for Georgia against Albania in the 2006 FIFA World Cup qualification. Later on, he managed score a goal against Croatia in UEFA Euro 2012 qualifying, and against Germany in UEFA Euro 2016 qualifying. On January 27 2022, Kankava announced his retirement from international football after appearing in 100 matches, captaining Georgia 62 times.

Career statistics

Scores and results list Georgia's goal tally first, score column indicates score after each Kankava goal.

Honours
Dinamo Tbilisi
 Georgian Cup winner: 2003-04

Dnipro
 UEFA Europa League runner-up: 2014–15

Slovan Bratislava
 Fortuna Liga: 2021–22

Awards
On 30 March 2014, Kankava saved the life of FC Dynamo Kyiv captain, Oleh Husyev, after Husyev was briefly knocked unconscious in a collision and swallowed his tongue which blocked his airway. Kankava reacted immediately by sticking his fingers in Husyev's mouth to dislodge his tongue and clear his airway. On 12 April 2014 before Dnipro played Metalurh Zaporizhya at the Dnipro Arena, Kankava was awarded the Order of Merit for his actions in Dnipropetrovsk.

References

External links

Living people
1986 births
Eastern Orthodox Christians from Georgia (country)
Footballers from Tbilisi
Association football midfielders
Footballers from Georgia (country)
Expatriate footballers from Georgia (country)
Georgia (country) under-21 international footballers
Georgia (country) international footballers
FC Dinamo Tbilisi players
FC Spartak Vladikavkaz players
FC Arsenal Kyiv players
FC Dnipro players
FC Kryvbas Kryvyi Rih players
Stade de Reims players
FC Tobol players
ŠK Slovan Bratislava players
Russian Premier League players
Ukrainian Premier League players
Ligue 1 players
Slovak Super Liga players
Recipients of the Order of Merit (Ukraine), 3rd class
Expatriate footballers in Russia
Expatriate footballers in Ukraine
Expatriate footballers in France
Expatriate footballers in Kazakhstan
Expatriate footballers in Slovakia
Expatriate sportspeople from Georgia (country) in Russia
Expatriate sportspeople from Georgia (country) in Ukraine
Expatriate sportspeople from Georgia (country) in France
Expatriate sportspeople from Georgia (country) in Kazakhstan
Expatriate sportspeople from Georgia (country) in Slovakia
FIFA Century Club
Georgia (country) youth international footballers
Valenciennes FC players